"Unsterblich" (Immortal) is a ballad by Die Toten Hosen. It's the second single and the tenth track from the album Unsterblich.

It is a love song, in which the narrator sings, how he feels like he were immortal, when he's with his beloved.

The CD-ROM track consists of the video of the single, a making-of film and photos.

Music video
The music video was directed by Peter Lindbergh and cinematographed by Darius Khondji. Shot on the Cornish coast, the video consists only of the camera holding on Campino's face, as he sings. At the end of the video Campino morphs into French model (and Lindbergh muse) Marie-Sophie Wilson.

Track listing
 "Unsterblich" (Frege, von Holst/Frege) − 3:46
 "Wofür man lebt (Dub-Version)" (What for one lives) (von Holst, Meurer/Frege) − 3:22
 "Psycho" (Roslie/Roslie) − 1:44 (The Sonics cover)
 "Unsterblich" (Video + CD-ROM Track)

Charts

2000 singles
Die Toten Hosen songs
Songs written by Campino (singer)
Songs written by Andreas von Holst
1999 songs